The Medvedev modernisation programme was an initiative launched by President of Russia Dmitry Medvedev in 2009, which aimed at modernising Russia's economy and society, decreasing the country's dependency on oil and gas revenues and creating a diversified economy based on high technology and innovation. The programme was based on the top 5 priorities for the country's technological development: efficient energy use; nuclear technology; information technology; medical technology and pharmaceuticals; and space technology in combination with telecommunications.

Announcement

Background 
After the near total collapse in 1998, the Russian economy recovered as a result of high oil prices during the presidency of Vladimir Putin, but remained heavily dependent on energy and raw material exports. In the first decade of the 2000s, global oil prices kept rising, fuelling economic growth. Medvedev later stated his belief that this was not only a boom, but also damaging to the Russian economy, saying that if the oil price is too high, "we’d never change the structure of our economy... We haven’t done anything in the last 10 years because oil kept rushing higher and higher."

There had been repeated calls for a more diversified economy under Putin; already in 2005, Putin's Prime Minister Mikhail Fradkov warned about the dependency of the economy on raw material exports, and in 2007 Deputy Prime Minister Sergey Ivanov said that without diversification, the Russian economy will sooner or later face a collapse. Dmitry Medvedev, elected as president in 2008, made economic modernisation his prime presidential agenda. Medvedev's statements regarding this issue went much further than other statements by the Russian leadership. In 2009, Medvedev founded the Presidential Commission on Innovation. The commission comprises almost the entire Russian government and some of the best minds from academia and business.

"Go Russia!"
Medvedev outlined his programme in an article called "Go Russia!" that was published online in September 2009. In the article, he formulated his strategic objective of modernising Russia. He criticised Russia's economic "backwardness" and what he called Russia's "humiliating" dependency on oil and raw materials. He described the Russian society as "archaic" and "paternalistic" and said that the country can no longer rely on the achievements of the past to secure a prosperous future. In Medvedev's view, Russia should aim for a modern, diversified economy based on high technology and innovation. Medvedev criticised the previous attempts to modernise Russia—those initiated by Peter I the Great and the Soviet Union—saying that the results they brought came at too high a cost, and this time modernisation must come not through coercion but via the development of the creative potential of every individual, through private entrepreneurship and initiative.

Medvedev identified five key areas for economic modernisation, in which breakthroughs must be achieved:
 Energy efficiency and new fuels
 Medical technologies and pharmaceuticals
 Nuclear power engineering
 Information technologies
 Space and telecommunications

Medvedev further discussed and publicised his programme in his second state of the nation address in November 2009, as well as in a televised speech in December 2009.

Programme structure

Efficient use of energy and resources 

As of 2014, the energy intensity of the Russian economy was estimated to be about 2.5 times more than the world average. The government set an aim of 40% decrease of the energy intensity by 2020. It was estimated that the main potential of achieving this aim lies within the housing sector and the budget organisations. The following state projects were initiated to increase energy efficiency:

Nuclear technology 

Nuclear power in Russia is managed by Rosatom State Corporation. The aim of the programme was to increase the total share of nuclear energy from 16.9% to 23% by 2020. It was planned to allocate 127 billion rubles ($5.42 billion) to a federal program dedicated to the next generation of nuclear energy technology. About 1 trillion rubles ($42.7 billion) was to be allocated from the federal budget to nuclear power and industry development before 2015. The programme aimed to establish secure, cheap, and long-term nuclear energy supply in Russia as well as increase Russian exports of nuclear energy and technology abroad. Besides construction of the new nuclear power plants in Russia and elsewhere, the following major state projects were initiated in the area of nuclear technology:

Information technology 

The government planned to develop the information society in Russia and counter a shortage of IT specialists due to high demand. In 2009 Russian companies employed more than 1 million IT specialists, making up 1.34% of the country's workforce, a figure lower than in other major economies such as the United States (3.74%), United Kingdom (3.16%), and Germany (3.14%). 

The following major state projects were realized or planned in the area of information technology:

Space technology and telecommunications 

Much of the sector area still awaited large-scale commercialisation,. aimed to be achieved by the combination of space technology and telecommunications. The following state projects were initiated in this area:

The funding of Russian Federal Space Agency Roscosmos has almost tripled from 2007, standing at $3.1 billion in 2011. President Medvedev and the modernisation programme is credited with the increase.

Medical technology and pharmaceuticals 

Despite a number of achievements, Russia was significantly behind the world leaders in medical technology and pharmaceutical production. The country produced only 20% of the drugs used domestically, while 80% is imported.

The specific major state projects in the area of medical technology and pharmaceuticals were not defined or announced. The government aimed to achieve the primarily domestical production of the most needed types of medical equipment and pharmaceuticals, as well as support the development and commercialization of new innovative products, especially those related to biotechnology, cell and nuclear medicine, and nanotechnology.

Results 
Modernisation under Medvedev failed.

See also 
Timeline of largest projects in the Russian economy

References

External links 
Presidential Commission on the modernisation and technological development of the Russian economy Official site. 

Economic history of Russia
Dmitry Medvedev
2009 in Russia
2009 in economics